Cloonaghlin Lough is a freshwater lake in the southwest of Ireland. It is located on the Iveragh Peninsula in County Kerry.

Geography

Hydrology
Cloonaghlin Lough drains into its smaller neighbour Lough Namona. This lake in turn drains into the Owengarriff River which joins the Cummeragh River.

Natural history
Fish species in Cloonaghlin Lough include salmon and sea trout. Salmon runs are dependent on high water levels in the Owengarriff and Cummeragh rivers.

See also
List of loughs in Ireland

References

Cloonaghlin